Events in the year 1818 in India.

Births
25 August - Shiv Dayal Singh, Founder and First Satguru of Radha Soami faith (died June 15,1878).

Events
National income - ₹11,927 million
 The first Mill of Cotton clothes in Kolkata
Manavadar (Bantva-Manavadar) becomes a British Protectorate, a Princely state which was founded in 1733.
 1 January – The Peshwa defeated at Koregaon by the British.
 6 January – Treaty of Mandasor is signed between the British and the Marathas.
 February – The Third Anglo-Maratha War which started in 1817 ends with the Marathas defeated by the British
 20 February – The Peshwa defeated at Ashti by the British.
 3 June – Baji Rao II surrenders to the British

Law

References 

 
India
Years of the 19th century in India